Pan de Azúcar is a Panama Metro station on Line 1. It was one of the first 11 stations when the metro was opened on 5 October 2014 and began operations on the following day. It is an elevated station. The station is located between San Miguelito and Los Andes.

Pan de Azúcar station is located in San Miguelito District, next to Highway 3.

References

Panama Metro stations
2014 establishments in Panama
Railway stations opened in 2014
San Miguelito District